Rrogozhinë railway station serves the city of Rrogozhinë in Tirana County, Albania.

The station opened in 1947 as part of the railway line from Durrës to Peqin

A branch from Rrogozhinë to Fier was opened in 1968. This branch was extended to Vlorë in 1985.

References

Railway stations in Albania
Railway stations opened in 1947